The SuccessTech Academy shooting was a school shooting that occurred on October 10, 2007, at the SuccessTech alternative high school in Cleveland, Ohio, United States. Fourteen-year-old freshman Asa H. Coon shot two students and two teachers before committing suicide on the fourth floor of the building.

Shooting
On Wednesday, October 10, 2007, Coon entered the five-story school building shortly before 1:00 p.m. EST, armed with two handguns (a .22-caliber revolver and a .38-caliber revolver), and a box of additional rounds of ammunition for each pistol; three folding knives were also in Coon's possession, which were all stocked together in a duffel bag. Wearing a Marilyn Manson concert shirt, black jeans, and black-painted fingernails, Coon walked to the fourth floor of the building and entered the men's washroom where he loaded two revolvers.

The shooting began at approximately 1:06 p.m. on the fourth floor of the building, after 14-year-old Michael Peek punched Coon in the face for bumping into him. When Peek walked away, Coon shot him in the abdomen.  Another student, 17-year-old Darnell Rodgers, suffered a graze gunshot wound to the elbow in the same hallway. Michael Grassie, a social studies teacher, was shot in the chest when Coon entered his classroom. A second teacher, David Kachadourian, was shot in the back of his shoulder while in the hallway evacuating his students. During the entire shooting, Coon was said to be cursing. The shooting ended when Coon entered another room and fatally shot himself in the right side of his head.

The school was placed on Code Blue lockdown shortly after the shooting.

Victims 
Four individuals were wounded in the shooting; two students and two teachers. The two injured teachers were treated at MetroHealth Medical Center, and the two students injured were treated at the Rainbow Babies & Children's Hospital. A 14-year-old student was also hospitalized for knee and back injuries received from being trampled in a hallway by fleeing students. One student and one teacher were discharged later that day; the other students were released the following day. The last victim was discharged from the hospital on October 15.

Perpetrator
Fourteen-year-old Coon had been placed on a three-day suspension two days prior to the shooting for an altercation with another student regarding the existence of God. According to Coon's uncle, Larry Looney, Coon said he was upset because the teachers would not listen to what he had to say regarding the fight. According to fellow students and teachers, Coon had apparently been the target of bullying by students at the school for his Gothic appearance and eccentric behavior, and had made threats of violence in front of students and teachers the week before the shooting. Joseph Fletcher, a friend of Coon, said he had been "pushed too far" and that teachers were unable to help with his problems. Michael Grassie, who was one of Coon's teachers, said that Coon was frustrated because he was given a failing grade in his World History class, and had made attempts to goad him into a fight.

Juvenile Court records show that Coon had a criminal history and mental health problems since 2005, and threatened to commit suicide while in a mental health facility in summer 2006.

Aftermath
At 2:50 p.m., an hour-and-a-half after the shooting, Cleveland Mayor Frank G. Jackson announced in a news conference that five people, including three students, were hurt in a shooting at the SuccessTech Academy. Four of them were shot; the students being in "stable" condition and the adults being in a more "elevated" state.

Classes throughout the Cleveland Metropolitan School District were canceled the following two days and resumed on Monday, October 15, and classes at SuccessTech Academy did not resume until Tuesday, October 16. Cleveland's public school system established an anonymous hotline for students to report threats and dangerous behavior. The school system also announced plans to install metal detectors in all its schools and hire additional armed security guards to patrol the campuses. Schools were instructed to implement additional security precautions, to be reviewed by a professional security firm.
 
A crime scene photo taken of Coon after his suicide was posted by Cleveland disc jockey Shane French (Rover) on a webpage promoting Rover's Morning Glory and soon taken down. Mayor Jackson called the photo, which he did not see, "extremely inappropriate". Cleveland police officer Walter Emerick, who took the picture using his cell phone camera, was suspended from duty for eight days for sending the photo to other people, who eventually leaked it to the Internet.

References

External links

 Cleveland.com — Coverage of the SuccessTech Academy shooting

2007 crimes in the United States
2007 in Ohio
2000s in Cleveland
School shootings committed by pupils
Suicides by firearm in Ohio
Violence in Ohio
Non-fatal shootings
Crimes in Cleveland
Attacks in the United States in 2007
October 2007 events in the United States
School shootings in Ohio
High school shootings in the United States
October 2007 crimes
2007 mass shootings in the United States
Mass shootings in Ohio
Mass shootings in the United States